Siphonochilus bambutiorum is a species of plant in the ginger family, Zingiberaceae. It was first described by Axel Dalberg Poulsen and John Michael Lock.

References 

bambutiorum